The meridian 100° west of the Prime Meridian of Greenwich is a line of longitude that extends from the North Pole across the Arctic Ocean, North America, the Pacific Ocean, the Southern Ocean, and Antarctica to the South Pole. The 100th meridian west forms a great circle with the 80th meridian east.

In the United States, this meridian roughly marks the boundary between the semi-arid climate in the west and the humid continental and humid subtropical climates in the east and is used as shorthand to refer to that arid-humid boundary.

From Pole to Pole
Starting at the North Pole and heading south to the South Pole, the 100th meridian west passes through:

{| class="wikitable plainrowheaders"
! scope="col" width="130" | Co-ordinates
! scope="col" | Country, territory or sea
! scope="col" | Notes
|-
| style="background:#b0e0e6;" | 
! scope="row" style="background:#b0e0e6;" | Arctic Ocean
| style="background:#b0e0e6;" |
|-
| 
! scope="row" | 
| Nunavut — Meighen Island
|-
| style="background:#b0e0e6;" | 
! scope="row" style="background:#b0e0e6;" | Peary Channel
| style="background:#b0e0e6;" |
|-
| 
! scope="row" | 
| Nunavut — Ellef Ringnes Island
|-
| style="background:#b0e0e6;" | 
! scope="row" style="background:#b0e0e6;" | Unnamed waterbody
| style="background:#b0e0e6;" |
|-
| 
! scope="row" | 
| Nunavut — Berkeley Islands and Bathurst Island
|-
| style="background:#b0e0e6;" | 
! scope="row" style="background:#b0e0e6;" | Parry Channel
| style="background:#b0e0e6;" |
|-
| 
! scope="row" | 
| Nunavut — Prince of Wales Island
|-
| style="background:#b0e0e6;" | 
! scope="row" style="background:#b0e0e6;" | M'Clintock Channel
| style="background:#b0e0e6;" |
|-
| style="background:#b0e0e6;" | 
! scope="row" style="background:#b0e0e6;" | Larsen Sound
| style="background:#b0e0e6;" | Passing just east of Gateshead Island, Nunavut,  (at )
|-
| style="background:#b0e0e6;" | 
! scope="row" style="background:#b0e0e6;" | Victoria Strait
| style="background:#b0e0e6;" |
|-
| 
! scope="row" | 
| Nunavut — Royal Geographical Society Islands
|-
| style="background:#b0e0e6;" | 
! scope="row" style="background:#b0e0e6;" | Queen Maud Gulf
| style="background:#b0e0e6;" | Passing just east of Hat Island, Nunavut,  (at )
|-valign="top"
| 
! scope="row" | 
|-valign="top"
| 
! scope="row" | 
| North Dakota South Dakota — from  Nebraska — from  Kansas — from  Oklahoma — from  Texas / Oklahoma border — from  Texas — from 
|-valign="top"
| 
! scope="row" | 
|-
| style="background:#b0e0e6;" | 
! scope="row" style="background:#b0e0e6;" | Pacific Ocean
| style="background:#b0e0e6;" |
|-
| style="background:#b0e0e6;" | 
! scope="row" style="background:#b0e0e6;" | Southern Ocean
| style="background:#b0e0e6;" |
|-
| 
! scope="row" | Antarctica
| Unclaimed territory
|-
|}

United States

In the United States the meridian 100° west of Greenwich forms the eastern border of the Texas panhandle with Oklahoma (which traces its origin to the Adams-Onís Treaty in 1819 which settled the border between New Spain and the United States between the Red River and Arkansas River).  Dodge City, Kansas lies exactly at the intersection of the Arkansas River and the 100th meridian.

As first noted by John Wesley Powell in the 1870s, there is a big difference in rainfall by the different sides of the meridian. In the central Great Plains, it roughly marks the western boundary of the normal reach of moist air from the Gulf of Mexico, and the approximate boundary (although some areas do push the boundary slightly farther east) between the semi-arid climate to the west and the humid continental (north of about 37°N) and humid subtropical (south of about 37°N) climates to the east. West of the meridian, raising livestock is much more economically important than east of it, and what agriculture does exist relies heavily on irrigation. Historically, the meridian has often been taken as a rough boundary between the eastern and western United States. White settlement, spreading westward after the American Civil War, settled the area around this meridian during the 1870s.

A sign across U.S. Highway 30 in Cozad, Nebraska, marks the place where the 100th meridian intersects with the routes of the Oregon Trail, Pony Express, transcontinental railroad, and the Lincoln Highway.

In popular culture
The song "At the Hundredth Meridian" by The Tragically Hip is about the 100th meridian west, specifically in Canada, and how it has traditionally been considered "where the great plains begin."

See also
Rain follows the plow

References

External links
 https://www.earthmagazine.org/article/dividing-line-past-present-and-future-100th-meridian

w100 meridian west
Borders of Oklahoma
Borders of Texas